Jacob Umaga (born 8 July 1998) is a professional rugby union player who plays at fly-half for Italian United Rugby Championship side Benetton.

Early life

Umaga was born in Halifax. His father, Mike Umaga, won 13 caps for Samoa, his uncle Tana Umaga played 74 times for New Zealand and captained the All Blacks, and his father's cousin was the late Jerry Collins.

Umaga was educated at Kenilworth School and Sports College and played youth rugby for Kenilworth RFC. He supports rugby league team Bradford Bulls.

Club career
Umaga was originally a member of the Leicester Tigers academy but left to join Wasps at the age of eighteen. He represented Hinckley RFC in National League 2 North during the 2016–17 campaign scoring five tries in eleven appearances, including an individual try at Preston Grasshoppers.  In 2018 Umaga was part of the Auckland squad that won the Mitre Cup. The following year saw him loaned to Yorkshire Carnegie for the 2018–19 RFU Championship. 

In October 2020 Umaga scored a try for Wasps as they lost to Exeter Chiefs in the Premiership final to finish runners up.

Umaga was made redundant along with every other Wasps player and coach when the team entered administration on 17 October 2022. He instead signed a two-year deal with Italy region Benetton in the URC from the 2022-23 season.

International career
Umaga was a member of the England Under-20 side that completed a grand slam during the 2017 Six Nations Under 20s Championship. Later that year he started for the side that finished runners up to New Zealand in the final of the 2017 World Rugby Under 20 Championship.

In January 2020 Umaga received his first call-up to the senior England squad by coach Eddie Jones for the 2020 Six Nations Championship. On 4 July 2021 he won his first cap off the bench in a 43–29 victory against the United States.

References

External links 
 ESPN Profile
 RFU Profile

1998 births
Living people
British people of Samoan descent
English people of New Zealand descent
English rugby union players
Leeds Tykes players
Rugby union fly-halves
Rugby union players from Halifax, West Yorkshire
Wasps RFC players
England international rugby union players
Auckland rugby union players
Benetton Rugby players